Warren Easton Charter High School is a secondary school in New Orleans, Louisiana. The Warren Easton Charter Foundation governs the school, which is chartered by Orleans Parish School Board.

History
The school was founded in 1843 as Boys High School. It was the first high school in the State of Louisiana and as a public school was formed to educate the working-class population of the city of New Orleans. By 1855 the school had expanded to four locations. After the Civil War in 1867, the four Boys High Schools were merged into Consolidated Boys High School.

In 1911, the Orleans Parish School Board bought a property for a new high school and construction began during that year. The school received its name in 1911, Warren Easton High School. It was named after Warren Easton, the first Supervisor of Education of the State of Louisiana and the City of New Orleans. The principal administrator and the faculty moved into 3019 Canal Street in 1913. The school was originally an all-boys school and in 1952 the school became coeducational. In 1967, Easton was racially integrated and in 1977 the school became a fundamental magnet school.

Prior to 2005, the school was directly under the authority of the Orleans Parish School Board. In 2005, as Hurricane Katrina was about to hit, the New Orleans Regional Transit Authority (RTA) designated Easton as a place where people could receive transportation to the Louisiana Superdome, a shelter of last resort. After Hurricane Katrina hit New Orleans, the school was closed for one year.

In 2006, the school re-opened as a charter school and became Warren Easton Charter High School. n 2007, actress Sandra Bullock adopted the school. Bullock contributed thousands of dollars to the school and also helped to build an on-campus health clinic.

Curriculum
In the 1930s the school hosted German language classes for adults. Chinese and Spanish are offered to students as a foreign language as of 2015.

Athletics
Warren Easton Charter athletics competes in the LHSAA.

Championships
Football championships
(9) State Championships: 1912, 1914, 1915, 1916, 1917, 1918, 1920, 1921, 1942

Notable alumni
 Salvador Anzelmo, Louisiana state representative 
 Lynn Dean, member of the Louisiana State Senate, 1996 to 2004; former parish president for St. Bernard Parish
 Charles Foti (Class of 1953), former Attorney General of Louisiana; former criminal sheriff of Orleans Parish
 Pete Fountain, clarinetist
Royce Johnson, actor
 Anthony Mackie (Class of 1997), Actor
 Master P (Class of 1987), rapper
 Lee Harvey Oswald, assassin of US President John F. Kennedy
 Louis Prima, Bandleader
 Clay Shaw, businessman implicated by New Orleans District Attorney Jim Garrison in the assassination of Kennedy
 Trombone Shorty (Class of 2004), Trumpet player
 Steve Van Buren, NFL halfback

References

External links

 Warren Easton Charter High School website

Charter schools in New Orleans
Public high schools in New Orleans
Educational institutions established in 1843
1843 establishments in Louisiana